Luke Brown (1935–1997) was an American professional wrestler.

Luke Brown may also refer to:
 Luke Brown (footballer, born 1902) (1902–1978), Australian rules footballer for Fitzroy
 Luke Brown (footballer, born 1992), Australian rules footballer for Adelaide
 Luke Brown (author) (born 1979), British novelist

See also
 Luke Brown House, a historic home located in Parishville, New York
Luke Browne (disambiguation)
 Brown (surname)